Ola Hejazi is an artist and art teacher of Saudi Arabia. She lives in Jeddah and her influences include the Arabic alphabet and use of printed ink. She is also known for not titling her work.

Education 
She graduated from the Faculty of Arabic Literature and has a Diploma in Educational Psychology.

Work 
Her works are most often interwoven with the influence of constant relocations and attempts to reconstruct memories that are left behind.

She has participated in various local and international exhibitions such as Earth Ever and After 21-39, Art Jeddah (2016), Nun Wa Alkalam, Islamic Arts Museum Malaysia (2013), Crounous & Karios, Essen Germany (2012), and Saudi Cultural Week in Korea (2012).

References 

People from Jeddah
Saudi Arabian women artists
Saudi Arabian artists
Living people
Year of birth missing (living people)